Raju Bharatan (1934 – February 7, 2020) was a journalist and writer on Indian cricket and  Bollywood music. He worked for a weekly features magazine, The Illustrated Weekly of India, and an Indian films weekly newspaper, Screen. He also directed The Victory Story (1974), the first full-length Indian cricket documentary.

He died aged 86 in Mumbai in February 2020 after a prolonged illness. He was survived by his daughter. His wife, Girija Rajendran, who predeceased him, was also a film journalist.

Books 
Bharatan wrote a number of books on cricket and on Hindi film music personalities, with whom he had a close association.
 Asha Bhosle: A Musical Biography (Publisher: Hay House; Latest edition (5 August 2016) )
 Naushadnama: The Life & Music of Naushad  (Publisher: Hay House India (2014) )
 A Journey Down Melody Lane  (Publisher: Hay House (1 September 2010)   Kindle edition in Amazon.in )
 Lata Mangeshkar: A Biography   (Publisher: UBS Publishers Distributors (2 January 1995) 
 Indian Cricket: The Vital Phase ( Published by Bell Books, 1977)
 Rivals in the Sun: A Survey of the 1952 Tour of England (Publisher: Popular Book Depot, 1952)

References

1934 births
2020 deaths
Indian cricket commentators
Indian sports journalists
Cricket historians and writers